The 2022 Incarnate Word Cardinals baseball team represented the University of the Incarnate Word during the 2022 NCAA Division I baseball season. The Cardinals played their home games at Sullivan Field and were led by third–year head coach Ryan Shotzberger. They were members of the Southland Conference.

Preseason

Southland Conference Coaches Poll
The Southland Conference Coaches Poll is to be released in the winter of 2022.

Preseason All-Southland Team & Honors

Second Team
Grant Smith – Shortstop
Nixon Brannan – Utility

Personnel

Schedule and results

References

Incarnate Word Cardinals
Incarnate Word Cardinals baseball seasons
Incarnate Word Cardinals baseball